Hyundai Department Store (Korean: 현대백화점 주식회사, Hanja: 現代百貨店株式會社), together with Lotte Department Store and Shinsegae, is one of the three major department store chains in South Korea. Its parent company is the Hyundai Department Store Group.

Stores

Seoul Metropolitan Area
Apgujeong Main Store (압구정 본점) in Gangnam-gu, Seoul
World Trade Center Store (무역센터점) in Gangnam-gu, Seoul
Cheonho Store (천호점, PHOTO SE SEOUL ) in Gangdong-gu, Seoul
Sinchon Store - Main Building & U-PLEX (신촌점 본관, 유플렉스) in Seodaemun-gu, Seoul
Mia Store (미아점) in Seongbuk-gu, Seoul
Mokdong Store (목동점) in Yangcheon-gu, Seoul
Jungdong Store (중동점) in Wonmi-gu, Bucheon, Gyeonggi-do
Kintex Store (킨텍스점) in Ilsanseo-gu, Goyang, Gyeonggi-do
Pangyo Store (판교점) in Bundang-gu, Seongnam, Gyeonggi-do
 The Hyundai Seoul Store at Parc one in Yeouido-dong, Seoul (flagship store)

Yeongnam Region
Ulsan Store (울산점) in Nam-gu, Ulsan
Ulsan Dong-gu Store (울산동구점) in Dong-gu, Ulsan
Busan Store (부산점) in Dong-gu, Busan
Daegu Store (대구점) in Jung-gu, Daegu

Hoseo Region
Chungcheong Store (충청점) in Heungdeok-gu, Cheongju, Chungcheongbuk-do
Outlet Stores

 Premium Outlets Gimpo
 Premium Outlets Songdo
 City Outlets Dasan
 City Outlets Dongdaemun

Defunct stores
Bupyeong Store in Bupyeong-gu, Incheon (closed in 2003)
Banpo Outlet in Seocho-gu, Seoul (closed in 2005)
Fashion Outlet "May" (formerly Ulsan Seongnam Store) in Jung-gu, Ulsan (closed in 2005)
Gwangju Store (광주점) in Buk-gu, Gwangju (closed in 2013)

References

External links

Hyundai Department Store

Department stores of South Korea
Companies listed on the Korea Exchange